The George C. Marshall Foundation in Lexington, Virginia, was commissioned by President Harry S. Truman in order to preserve the papers of General George C. Marshall. Marshall served as Army chief of staff, secretary of state and defense and received the Nobel Peace Prize in 1953 for the Marshall Plan.

The Foundation
The Foundation is located on the Post of the Virginia Military Institute, and contains a library, archive, and administrative offices. Dedicated on May 23, 1964, a large ceremony was held with soldiers and statesmen in attendance. Presidents Lyndon B. Johnson and Dwight D. Eisenhower spoke at the ceremony. Its first president was General Omar Bradley. Members of the original board of directors included Robert A. Lovett, Dr. Forrest C. Pogue and General Frank McCarthy.

George C. Marshall Museum & Library

The Marshall Museum displayed exhibits of Marshall's life and work in the entry hall and two adjacent galleries, one focused on his military career and the other on his achievements following World War II.

In August 2019 the foundation planned to renovate the museum, although construction never moved forward. 

In January 2021 the Marshall Museum closed its doors. A small collection of artifacts are to be kept by the Foundation while the rest will be sent for permanent display at other museums.

The Marshall Research Library covers United States military & diplomatic history between the years of George Marshall's career as a military officer and public servant, roughly 1900-1960. Along with sorted paper collections, the library contains more than 23,000 manuscripts, two million documents including many from the National Archives and Records Administration, hundreds of era maps, thousands of photographs, 700 posters from all countries involved in both World Wars, films, and over 250 oral histories.

References

External links

The George C. Marshall Foundation
The George C. Marshall Foundation gallery, Google Arts & Culture
Gates Receives George C. Marshall Award, Department of Defense Photo Essay

Marshall, George C.
Libraries in Virginia
Library buildings completed in 1964
Military and war museums in Virginia
Museums in Lexington, Virginia
Organizations established in 1953